Sonoma County, California, U.S.A. has numerous regional parks, beaches, trails, and other facilities that are maintained by the Sonoma County Regional Parks Department.

Sonoma County regional parks typically provide facilities for hiking, picnicking, horseback riding, and mountain biking. Some Parks Department facilities are trails for day-hiking or accessing beaches along the rugged Pacific coast. Certain facilities include swimming areas, skateparks, dog parks, basketball courts, sports fields, and playgrounds. Marinas and river parks typically offer fishing and boat ramps.

See also 
 List of beaches in Sonoma County, California
 Regional park
 Sonoma County Historic Landmarks and Districts

References 

 Sonoma County Regional Parks Map and Guide, Revised March, 2011.

External links 
 Sonoma County Regional Parks homepage
https://sonomacounty.ca.gov/Parks/Planning/Mark-West-Creek-Park-and-Preserve/

Parks in Sonoma County, California
Sonoma County
Sonoma County Regional Parks facilities